USS Emeline (SP-175) was a yacht acquired by the U.S. Navy during World War I. She was outfitted with military equipment, including 3-inch guns, and was commissioned as a patrol craft, assigned to protect shipping in the North Atlantic Ocean. She saved the lives of survivors of shipwrecks, and provided escort protection from German submarines for commercial ships.  Post-war she was sold to the highest bidder, who had the yacht sail to San Diego, California, for delivery.

Built in Scotland 

Emeline (No. 175), a yacht, was built as Katoomba in 1898 by Ailsa Shipbuilding Company, Greenock, Scotland; purchased by the U.S. Navy 10 June 1917; and commissioned 14 July 1917.

World War I service

Assigned to the North Atlantic Ocean 
 
Emeline arrived at Brest, France, 30 August 1917, for patrol off Ushant and to escort convoys between English and French ports. She gave invaluable aid to ships in distress, rescuing survivors of:

 SS Spero, sunk on 2 November 1916 by SM U-69;
 SS Saracen, wrecked on the rocks off Les Platresses on 26 December;
 and survivors of the torpedoed SS John G. McCullough on 17 May 1918.

Post-war decommissioning and sale 

She returned to New London, Connecticut, after the war, was decommissioned at New York City 19 May 1919, and sold 9 October 1920 to her new owner, R.J. Robinson of San Diego, California.

References
 
 Emeline (American Steam Yacht, 1898). Previously named Katoomba and Rivera. Later named Katharine R. Served as USS Emeline (SP-175) in 1917-1920

Steam yachts
Ships built on the River Clyde
Patrol vessels of the United States Navy
1898 ships
World War I patrol vessels of the United States